The fulvous shrike-tanager (Lanio fulvus) is a South American bird in the tanager family Thraupidae.
It is found in Brazil, Colombia, Ecuador, French Guiana, Guyana, Peru, Suriname, and Venezuela.
Its natural habitat is subtropical or tropical moist lowland forests.

Taxonomy
The fulvous shrike-tanager was described by the French polymath Georges-Louis Leclerc, Comte de Buffon in 1779 in his Histoire Naturelle des Oiseaux from a specimen collected in Cayenne, French Guiana. The bird was also illustrated in a hand-coloured plate engraved by François-Nicolas Martinet in the Planches Enluminées D'Histoire Naturelle which was produced under the supervision of Edme-Louis Daubenton to accompany Buffon's text.  Neither the plate caption nor Buffon's description included a scientific name but in 1783 the Dutch naturalist Pieter Boddaert coined the binomial name Tangara fulva in his catalogue of the Planches Enluminées. The fulvous shrike-tanager is now placed in the genus Lanio that was introduced by the French ornithologist Louis Jean Pierre Vieillot in 1816 with the fulvous shrike-tanager as the type species. The genus name is derived from the shrike genus Lanius that had been introduced by the Swedish naturalist Carl Linnaeus in 1758 in the tenth edition of his Systema Naturae. The specific fulvus is Latin for "tawny", "brown" or "fulvous".

Two subspecies are recognised:
 L. f. peruvianus Carriker, 1934 – west Venezuela, south Colombia, east Ecuador and northeast Peru
 L. f. fulvus (Boddaert, 1783) – southeast Venezuela, the Guianas and north Brazil

References

External links
 Xeno-canto: audio recordings of the fulvous shrike-tanager

fulvous shrike-tanager
Birds of Colombia
Birds of the Amazon Basin
Birds of the Ecuadorian Amazon
Birds of the Peruvian Amazon
Birds of the Guianas
fulvous shrike-tanager
Taxonomy articles created by Polbot